The Ocolișel is a small river in the Apuseni Mountains, Cluj County, western Romania. It is a left tributary of the river Arieș. It flows through the commune of Iara, and joins the Arieș near the village Lungești. In its upper course it is also called Vad or Valea Vadului.

References

Rivers of Romania
Rivers of Cluj County